Events during the year 1936 in  Northern Ireland.

Incumbents
 Governor - 	 The Duke of Abercorn 
 Prime Minister - James Craig

Events
Public Order Act is introduced, giving the Chief Constable power to impose conditions on parades or public processions if it is believed that they would lead to public disorder.
The British Air Ministry forms a new aircraft factory in Belfast, creating a new company owned 50% each by Harland and Wolff and Short Brothers, Short & Harland Ltd.

Arts and literature
Belfast School of Music opens its new premises.
Construction begins on the BBC's Broadcasting House, Belfast.
1 November – Louis MacNeice's translation of The Agamemnon of Aeschylus is premiered in London.

Sport

Football
Irish League
Winners: Belfast Celtic

Irish Cup
Winners: Linfield 2 - 0 Derry City

Births
20 February – Roy Beggs, Ulster Unionist Party MP.
7 March – Freddie Gilroy, boxer.
13 March – Stanley Hewitt, cricketer (died 2001).
5 April – John Kelly, Sinn Féin Councillor and MLA (died 2007).
24 April – Robert McCartney, leader of UK Unionist Party, MLA and a QC.
10 June – Brendan Duddy, businessman and intermediary in the Northern Ireland peace process (died 2017).
1 August – Leonard Steinberg, Baron Steinberg, British life peer, businessman and multi-millionaire.
17 August – Seamus Mallon, Deputy Leader of the Social Democratic and Labour Party and first Deputy First Minister of Northern Ireland (died 2020).
24 September – John Magee SPS, Bishop of Cloyne (1987- ), private secretary to Pope John Paul II.
5 October – Brian Hannon, Bishop of Clogher (Church of Ireland) (1986-2001).
22 December – James Burke, science historian, author and television presenter-producer.

Deaths
30 November – Jimmy Elwood, footballer (born 1901).

See also
1936 in Scotland
1936 in Wales

References